Krejčír is a Czech-language occupational surname, literally meaning 'tailor'. Notable people with the surname include: 

Radovan Krejčíř (born 1968), Czech convicted criminal
Timothy Wayne Krajcir (born Timothy Wayne McBride; November 28, 1944) American serial killer

Occupational surnames
Czech-language surnames